Kate Mitchell is a Labrador Inuit politician who was the First Minister of Nunatsiavut from 2014 to 2019.

Career 
Mitchell's political platform included advocating for seniors, tackling housing shortages, enforcing a recent land claims agreement, and government transparency. Mitchell was elected as the Ordinary Member for Makkovik in the Nunatsaivut Assembly in May 2014. She resigned from her position as First Minister in 2019 after allegations that she acted inappropriately in a housing matter and was replaced by Tony Andersen. She continued to serve as the Ordinary Member for Makkovik until she resigned from that position in December 2019.

References 

Living people
Year of birth missing (living people)
21st-century Canadian politicians
21st-century Canadian women politicians
Inuit politicians
Indigenous leaders in Atlantic Canada
Inuit from Newfoundland and Labrador
Canadian Inuit women
First Ministers of Nunatsiavut